The 2014-15 American Soccer League season is the first in league history. Historically, it is the fourth league to be called American Soccer League. The fall season began on August 23 with two games and ended on November 8. The spring season started on April 4 and ended on June 23.

Teams

Stadiums and Locations

Personnel and kits

Note: Flags indicate national team as has been defined under FIFA eligibility rules. Players may hold more than one non-FIFA nationality.

Standings

Northeast Conference

Mid-Atlantic Conference

Playoffs

Semi-finals

Championship

References

2015 in American soccer leagues